Zhibek Arapbayeva (born December 8, 1991 in Shymkent) is a Kazakh freestyle skier, specializing in aerials .

Arapbayeva competed at the 2010 Winter Olympics for Kazakhstan. She placed 23rd in the qualifying round of the aerials, failing to advance to the final.

As of April 2013, her best showing at the World Championships is 18th, in 2013.

Arapbayeva made her World Cup debut in December 2008. As of April 2013, her best finish at a World Cup event is 8th, at Bukovel in 2012/13. Her best World Cup overall finish in aerials is 24th, in 2012/13.

References

1991 births
Living people
Olympic freestyle skiers of Kazakhstan
Freestyle skiers at the 2010 Winter Olympics
Freestyle skiers at the 2014 Winter Olympics
People from Shymkent
Kazakhstani female freestyle skiers
Asian Games medalists in freestyle skiing
Freestyle skiers at the 2011 Asian Winter Games
Universiade medalists in freestyle skiing
Asian Games silver medalists for Kazakhstan
Medalists at the 2011 Asian Winter Games
Universiade silver medalists for Kazakhstan
Competitors at the 2017 Winter Universiade
21st-century Kazakhstani women